Shabab Majdal Anjar Club is a football club based in Majdal Anjar, Lebanon, that competes in the .

History 
Formerly called Racing Club Jounieh and based in Jounieh, the club moved to Barja and changed their name to Barjalona Sporting Club on 2 September 2009.

In December 2016, the club's license was bought by Shabab Majdal Anjar Club and moved to Majdal Anjar. The club finished runners-up in the 2020–21 Lebanese Third Division, and were promoted to the Lebanese Second Division.

Honours
 Lebanese Third Division
Winners (1): 2004–05

References

Football clubs in Lebanon
2016 establishments in Lebanon
Association football clubs established in 2009
Association football clubs established in 2016